Kurumaddali Lakshmi Narasimha Rao (7 August 1947 – 16 September 2012), better known by his stage name Suthi Velu, was an Indian actor and comedian known for his works in Telugu cinema. He has acted in more than 200 films, and won four state Nandi Awards.

Early life
Suthi Velu's father was a teacher. From an early age he was interested in drama and also developed an interest in acting. He then decided to take up acting seriously. At the age of 7, he had given a stage performance in his town. His father discouraged him and asked him not to show interest in acting. He started his film career with Mudda Mandaaram (1981), and acted in many of Jandhyala's films, which made him famous.

Career
Suthivelu's comedy spanned from 1980 to 2000 in Tollywood. He is famous for timing his dialogues and expressions, particularly in director Jandhyala's comedy films. His collaboration with Suthi Veerabhadra Rao is very popular and the duo was nicknamed Suthi Janta. During his childhood, he was very lean, so one of his neighbours Jaanakamba used to call him Velu (meaning finger in Telugu). His name in the film Nalugu Stambhalata (1982) is Gurnadham. After the success of Nalugu Stambhalata, people started calling him Suthi Velu. He also acted in Popular Telugu comedy serials such as Anandobrahma on Doordarshan and Lady Detective on ETV.

Personal life 
Suthi Velu was married to Lakshmi Rajyam, and have four children, three girls and a boy. He died of cardiac arrest at his residence on 16 September 2012.

Awards
Nandi Awards
 Best Supporting Actor – Vande Mataram (1985)
 Best Male Comedian - Devalayam (1985)
 Best Male Comedian - Geethanjali (1989)
 Best Male Comedian - Master Kapuram (1990)

Filmography

References

External links

20th-century Indian male actors
Male actors in Telugu cinema
1947 births
Telugu comedians
2012 deaths
Indian male comedians
Indian male film actors
Nandi Award winners
People from Krishna district
Male actors from Andhra Pradesh
21st-century Indian male actors